The Erythropotamos (meaning "red river") or Luda reka (meaning "mad river") is a river in southern Bulgaria (Haskovo Province) and northeastern Greece (Evros regional unit). Its Turkish name was Kızıldelisu. Its source is near Mega Dereio. It flows into the Maritsa (Evros) near Didymoteicho.

The source of the river is in the eastern Rhodope Mountains in the western Evros regional unit, Greece, near the village Mikro Dereio. It crosses the border with Bulgaria near Gorno Lukovo in the Ivaylovgrad municipality, and forms the Greek-Bulgarian border for several kilometers. It crosses back into Greece between the villages Siv Kladenets and Alepochori. It passes the villages Ladi, Mani and Koufovouno before flowing into the Evros just beyond Didymoteicho.

Its largest tributary is the Byala reka ("white river") in Bulgaria, which flows into the Luda reka near the village Odrintsi.

Rivers of Bulgaria
Rivers of Greece
International rivers of Europe
Geography of Thrace
Rivers of Eastern Macedonia and Thrace
Landforms of Evros (regional unit)
Landforms of Haskovo Province
Bulgaria–Greece border
Border rivers